The Bengali Language Movement of Barak Valley was a protest against the decision of the Government of Assam to make Assamese the only sole official language of the state, even though knowing that a major proportion of the Barak Valley population speaks Bangla language. About 80% of the Valley's residents are ethnic Bengalis. In the Barak Valley region, the ethnic Bengali population consists of both Hindus and Muslims, who are almost equal in population and constitute the overwhelming majority of the population. There is also a substantial minority of native tribals and immigrants from other parts of India. The main incident took place on 19 May 1961 at Silchar railway station in which 11 ethnic Bengalis were killed by Assam police.

Events of 1960-61

Background
In April, 1960, a proposal was raised at the Assam Pradesh Congress Committee, to declare Assamese as the one and only official language of the state.

On 10 October 1960, Bimala Prasad Chaliha, the then Chief Minister of Assam presented a bill in the Legislative Assembly that sought to legalize Assamese as the sole official language of the state. Ranendra Mohan Das, the legislator from Karimganj (North) assembly constituency and an ethnic Bengali, protested against the bill on the ground that it sought to impose the language of a third of the population over the rest two thirds. On 24 October, the bill was passed in the Assam legislative assembly thereby making Assamese as the one and only official language of the state.

Protest
On 5 February 1961, the Cachar Gana Sangram Parishad was formed to agitate against the imposition of Assamese in the Bengali-speaking Barak Valley. On 14 April, the people of Silchar, Karimganj and Hailakandi observed a Sankalpa Divas in protest against the injustice of the Assamese government. On 24 April, the Parishad flagged off a fortnight long padayatra in the Barak Valley, in the regions surrounding Silchar and Karimganj to raise awareness among the masses. The satyagrahis who took part in the padayatra walked over 200 miles and covered several villages. The procession ended on 2 May in Silchar. Later on a similar padayatra was organized in Hailakandi. After the padayatra, Rathindranath Sen, the Parishad chief declared that if Bengali was not accorded the status of official language by 13 April 1961, a complete hartal would be observed on 19 May from dawn to dusk. The Parishad also called for due recognition of the languages of other linguistic minorities.

On 12 May, the soldiers of the Assam Rifles, the Madras Regiment and the Central Reserve Police staged flag march in Silchar. On 18 May, the Assam police arrested three prominent leaders of the movement, namely Nalinikanta Das, Rathindranath Sen and Bidhubhushan Chowdhury, the editor of weekly Yugashakti.

Main incident of 19 May 

On 19 May, the dawn to dusk hartal started. Picketing started in the sub-divisional towns of Silchar, Karimganj and Hailakandi from early in the morning. In Karimganj, the agitators picketed in front of government offices, courts and railway station. In Silchar, the agitators picketed in the railway station. The last train from Silchar was around 4 PM, after which the hartal would be effectively dissolved. Not a single ticket was sold for the first train at 5-40 AM. The morning passed off peacefully without any untoward incident. However, in the afternoon, the Assam Rifles arrived at the railway station.

At around 2-30 PM, a Bedford truck carrying nine arrested Satyagrahis from Katigorah was passing by the Tarapur railway station (present-day Silchar railway station). Seeing the fellow activists arrested and being taken away, the Satyagrahis assembled at the railway tracks broke out in loud protests. At that point the truck driver and the policemen escorting the arrested fled the spot. Immediately after they fled, an unidentified person set fire to the truck. A fire fighting team immediately rushed to the spot to bring the fire under control. Within five minutes, at around 2-35 PM, the paramilitary forces, guarding the railway station, started beating the protesters with rifle butts and batons without any provocation from them. Then within a span of seven minutes they fired 17 rounds into the crowd. Twelve persons received bullet wounds and were carried to hospitals. Nine of them died that day. Ullaskar Dutta send nine bouquets for nine martyrs. On 20 May, the people of Silchar took out a procession with the bodies of the martyrs in protest of the killings. Two more persons died later. One person, Krishna Kanta Biswas survived for another 24 hours with bullet wound in chest.

Effect 

After the incident, the Assam government had to withdraw the circular and Bengali was ultimately given official status in the three districts of Barak Valley. Section 5 of Assam Act XVIII, 1961, safeguards the use of Bengali in the Cachar district. It says, "Without prejudice to the provisions contained in Section 3, the Bengali language shall be used for administrative and other official purposes up to and including district level."

Legacy 

This massacre is compared with the one in Bangladesh on 21 February 1952 when students demonstrating for recognition of their language, Bengali, as one of the two national languages of the then Pakistan, were shot and killed by police in Dhaka, which is the capital of present-day Bangladesh.

Every year on 19 May is celebrated as Bhasha Shahid Divas to commemorate those 11 martyrs who sacrificed their lives for the sake of protecting Bengali language, various cultural programmes are conducted, rallies are taken out and bust of those martyrs are decorated with flower garlands.

The Assam government had on 30 November 2013, issued a circular asking the deputy commissioners of all districts of the state to ensure use of Assamese as official language, which generated a lot of protests in the three Barak Valley districts – Cachar, Karimganj and Hailakandi. Section 5 of the Assam Official Language Act 1960 as amended in 1967 had specified Bengali as the official language anyway. This prompted the state government to issue a fresh circular on September 9 saying that the official language (Bengali) of Barak Valley will continue to be used for all official works.

List of martyrs 
Eleven persons were martyred in 1961. Nine persons died on 19 May 1961, two died later.
 Kanailal Niyogi
 Chandicharan Sutradhar
 Hitesh Biswas
 Satyendra Deb
 Kumud Ranjan Das
 Sunil Sarkar
 Tarani Debnath
 Sachindra Chandra Pal
 Birendra Sutradhar
 Sukamal Purakayastha
 Kamala Bhattacharya

One person was martyred on 17 August 1972.
 Bijan Chakraborty

Two more persons were martyred in 1986.
 Jaganmay Deb
 Dibyendu Das

Other than eleven martyrs of 19 May 1961, many protesters of 1961 language movement were badly beaten up by lathis and bayonets of armed forces. Many faced bullet injuries. At least 30 of them were admitted to Silchar Civil Hospital, others were released after first aid treatment. Of these 30 activists some lived with pain and mark of bullet injuries for the remaining part of their lives. Some organizations and writers in Barak valley attribute martyrdom to them alongside eleven martyrs of Bengali language movement of 1961. Their names are:
Pradip Kumar Dutta
Krishna Kanta Biswas
Manik Miya Laskar
Nishitendra Narayan Thakur
Santosh Chandra Kirtoniya
Bhupendra Kumar Paul
Sita Dey
Monoranjan Sarkar
Anjali Rani Deb

Memorial 

A martyr's tomb, known as the Shahid Minar was erected in Silchar in the memory of the martyrs. This tomb stone shelter the ashes of the braves who chose death for their right to get formal education in their mother tongue in their free country. In 2011, Gopa Dutta Aich unveiled a bronze bust of Kamala Bhattacharya in the premises of the Chhotelal Seth Institute under the initiative of Shahid Kamala Bhattacharya Murti Sthapan Committee.

See also 
 Bengali language movement in India
 Bengali language movement in Bangladesh

References 

1961 in India
1961 protests
1960s in Assam
Bengali language movement
Language conflict in India
Protests in India